Eeva Maija Kaarina Kuuskoski (born 4 October 1946) is a Finnish politician and physician. She was Member of the Parliament of Finland for Finland Proper from 1979 to 1995 and Minister of Social Affairs and Health from 1983 to 1987 and again from 1991 to 1992.

Life 

Kuuskoski worked as a physician before being elected to the Parliament in 1979. Initially a member of the National Coalition Party, she switched to the Centre Party in 1980. She ran for Leader of the Centre Party in 1990 but was defeated by Esko Aho. Kuuskoski resigned from the Aho Cabinet in 1992 to protest against public spending cuts. In 1994, she ran for President of Finland as an independent candidate, receiving 2.6 per cent of the popular vote in the first round.

In 1995, Kuuskoski left politics to work for the Mannerheim League for Child Welfare and was appointed its general secretary in 1998. In 2007 she was removed from office after she had been convicted of assaulting Helena Molander, an employee of the Mannerheim League. Since 2015 Kuuskoski has been chairwoman of the Pensioner Alliance.

Personal life 

In 1973 Kuuskoski married Member of the Parliament Juha Vikatmaa who committed suicide next year. In 1991 she married journalist Pentti Manninen and gave birth to a daughter.

References

External links 

 

1946 births
Living people
People from Aura, Finland
National Coalition Party politicians
Centre Party (Finland) politicians
Ministers of Social Affairs of Finland
Members of the Parliament of Finland (1979–83)
Members of the Parliament of Finland (1983–87)
Members of the Parliament of Finland (1987–91)
Members of the Parliament of Finland (1991–95)
20th-century Finnish physicians
University of Turku alumni
Candidates for President of Finland